William Roach (12 December 1914 – 8 June 1944) was an Australian cricketer. He played three first-class matches for Western Australia in 1933/34.

See also
 List of Western Australia first-class cricketers

References

External links
 

1914 births
1944 deaths
Australian cricketers
Western Australia cricketers
Royal Australian Air Force personnel of World War II
Australian military personnel killed in World War II
Australian World War II pilots
Royal Australian Air Force airmen
Cricketers from Fremantle
Military personnel from Western Australia